The 41st Golden Horse Awards (Mandarin:第41屆金馬獎) took place on December 4, 2004 at Zhongshan Hall in Taichung, Taiwan.

References

41st
2004 film awards
2004 in Taiwan